Lennart Carl Oscar Magnusson (1 January 1924 – 2 September 2011) was a Swedish fencer. He won a silver medal in the team épée event at the 1952 Summer Olympics.

References

External links
 

1924 births
2011 deaths
Swedish male épée fencers
Olympic fencers of Sweden
Fencers at the 1952 Summer Olympics
Olympic silver medalists for Sweden
Olympic medalists in fencing
Sportspeople from Stockholm
Medalists at the 1952 Summer Olympics